"Homesick" is a song co-written and recorded by American country music singer Kane Brown. It was released as the third single to his second major-label album, Experiment, on August 5, 2019. Brown wrote the song with Brock Berryhill, Matt McGinn, and Taylor Phillips, and it was produced by Dann Huff.

Content
"Homesick" was co-written by Brown with Brock Berryhill, Matt McGinn, and Taylor Phillips about Brown's own "experience traveling on the road and being away from his loved ones," but the singer dedicated the song to military families: "I thought, 'There's not many songs going out these days about the military like there used to be.' I felt like this would really hit home for them. Just kind of like memories of, you know, anybody dancing in a kitchen, singing favorite songs with each other." Brown got his inspiration for the song while at a tattoo parlor when the artist suggested he put the word "homesick" on his knuckles, and he started writing the song on his bus before a performance at Coyote Joe's in Charlotte, North Carolina.

Chart performance
"Homesick" debuted at number 24 on the Billboard Hot Country Songs chart dated September 22, 2018, before its initial release as a single. It later debuted at number 45 on the Billboard Country Airplay chart dated August 17, 2019. It also debuted at number 95 on the US Billboard Hot 100 chart dated November 30, 2019. It reached number one on Country Airplay in March 2020, which is Brown's fifth consecutive number one on the chart.

, the song has sold 136,000 copies in the US. On September 29, 2020, the single was certified double platinum by the Recording Industry Association of America (RIAA) for combined sales and streaming equivalent units of over two million units in the United States.

Music video
The music video for "Homesick" premiered on September 20, 2018. In it, Brown is shown performing the song for the California National Guard, interspersed with a compilation of clips that show service members returning home to their families.

Charts

Weekly charts

Year-end charts

Certifications

References

2018 songs
2019 singles
Kane Brown songs
RCA Records Nashville singles
Songs written by Kane Brown
Songs written by Matt McGinn (songwriter)
Song recordings produced by Dann Huff
Songs written by Brock Berryhill
Songs written by Taylor Phillips (songwriter)